Mount Elliott is an isolated mountain on Vancouver Island, British Columbia, Canada, located  northeast of Woss and  northwest of Mount Abel. It contains a high treeline and minimal alpine terrain.

See also
Geography of British Columbia

References

One-thousanders of British Columbia
Vancouver Island Ranges
Rupert Land District